Christian Rätsch (20 April 1957 – 17 September 2022) was a German anthropologist and writer on topics like ethnopharmacology, psychoactive plants and animals.

Life 
Rätsch was born in 1957 in a Bohemian community in Hamburg, Germany. His father was an opera singer, his mother a ballet dancer. He started learning about shamanism and sacred plants at 10 and had his first drug experience at 12.

Rätsch earned a doctorate in Native American cultures.  He conducted field research for three years while living with the Lacandón Indians in Chiapas, Mexico investigating shamanism first-hand, and completed his doctorate on their incantations and spells. Rätsch resided in Hamburg with his wife Claudia Müller-Ebeling. He is the founder and co-editor of The Yearbook of Ethnomedicine and the Study of Consciousness.

Rätsch died at the age of 65 from an undiscovered stomach ulcer, which he had staunchly tamed over the years.

Selected works

The Encyclopedia of Psychoactive Plants: Ethnopharmacology and Its Applications 
Christian Rätsch's The Encyclopedia of Psychoactive Plants describes the botany, history, distribution, cultivation, preparation, and dosage of more than 400 psychoactive plants (while not strictly plants, the encyclopedia also includes psychoactive fungi). The encyclopedia also offers information on ritual and medicinal use (see also ethnopharmacology).
The encyclopedia features 168 detailed monographs on the major psychoactive plants (e.g., Cannabis, Datura, and Papaver) as well as 20 full monographs on psychoactive fungi (e.g., Psilocybe and Amanita).

Bibliography 
 Müller-Ebeling, Claudia and Christian Rätsch and Surendra Bahadur Shahi (2002). Shamanism  and Tantra in the Himalayas. Transl. by Annabel Lee. Rochester, Vt.: Inner Traditions International.
 
 Marijuana Medicine: A World Tour of the Healing and Visionary Powers of Cannabis Paperback – by Christian Rätsch - March 1, 2001
 Müller-Ebeling, Claudia, Christian Rätsch and Arno Adaalars (2016). Ayahuasca:Rituals, Potions and Visionary Art from the Amazon. Published by Divine Arts. 
 Markus Berger and Christian Rätsch (2022). Enzyklopädie der psychoaktiven Pflanzen – Band 2. AT Verlag.

See also 
 Christophe Wiart
 Dennis McKenna
 Terence McKenna
 List of psychoactive plants

References

External links
 Erowid: Christian Rätsch
 Christian Rätsch's website
 John Horgan article on Christian Rätsch

1957 births
2022 deaths
Psychedelic drug advocates
Psychedelic drug researchers
Scientists from Hamburg
University of Hamburg alumni
German modern pagans
Deaths from cancer